Macena is a surname. Notable people with the surname include:

 Felipe Macena (born 1993), Brazilian footballer
 Gilberto Macena (born 1984), Brazilian footballer
 Raphael Macena (born 1989), Brazilian footballer

See also
 Maceda (surname)